L. occidentale may refer to:
Lacistema occidentale
Lilium occidentale
Liometopum occidentale
Lithothamnion occidentale